The 2010 Omaha Nighthawks season was the first season for the United Football League franchise. The team finished with a 3–5 record and last in the league.

Offseason

Expansion draft

UFL draft

Personnel

Staff

Roster

Schedule

Standings

Game summaries

Week 2: vs. Hartford Colonials

In what is regarded as the best UFL game played so far, Jeff Garcia completed a pass to Robert Ferguson with six seconds left to give the Nighthawks a win 27–26.

References

Omaha Nighthawks Season, 2010
Omaha Nighthawks seasons
Omaha Nighthawks